The 2006–07 Maltese First Division (known as 2006–07 BOV First Division due to sponsorship reasons) started on September 3 and finished on May 13. Mosta and Ħamrun Spartans were the teams which were relegated from the 2005–06 Maltese Premier League. Qormi and Vittoriosa Stars were the promoted teams from 2005–06 Maltese Second Division. Ħamrun Spartans finished as champions and returned to the Premier League, having just been relegated. Mqabba were also promoted as runners-up. San Ġwann and Naxxar Lions were relegated to the Second Division.

Teams

The Maltese First Division 2006–07 was made up of these teams:
 Ħamrun Spartans
 Mosta
 Mqabba
 Naxxar Lions
 Qormi
 San Ġwann
 Senglea Athletic
 St. Patrick
 Tarxien Rainbows
 Vittoriosa Stars

Changes from previous season
 St. George's and Marsa were promoted from First Division to the Premier League. They were replaced with Mosta and Ħamrun Spartans, both relegated from 2005–06 Maltese Premier League.
 Lija Athletic and St. Andrews were relegated to the 2006–07 Maltese Second Division. They were replaced with Qormi and Vittoriosa Stars.

League table

Results

Top scorers

References

Maltese First Division seasons
Malta
2